Lawrence Jackson  (22 March 192615 November 2002) was an Anglican priest.

A Yorkshireman, Jackson trained for the priesthood at King's College London (spending his final year at St Boniface College, Warminster) and was ordained in 1951. He was a Curate at St Margaret's Church, Leicester and then Vicar of Wymeswold. After further incumbencies at St James the Greater, Leicester and Holy Trinity, Coventry, he was appointed Provost of Blackburn in October 1973. He retired in December 1992 and died in 2002.

References

1926 births
2002 deaths
Alumni of the Theological Department of King's College London
Associates of King's College London
Provosts and Deans of Blackburn
People from Hessle